Dougherty, Texas may refer to:

Dougherty, Floyd County, Texas
Dougherty, Rains County, Texas